New Mount Pleasant is an unincorporated community in Jefferson Township, Jay County, Indiana.

History
New Mount Pleasant was founded in 1838. The community was named after a Friends meeting house in Mount Pleasant, Ohio. A post office was established at New Mount Pleasant in 1839, and remained in operation until it was discontinued in 1907.

Geography

References

Unincorporated communities in Jay County, Indiana
Unincorporated communities in Indiana
Populated places established in 1838
1838 establishments in Indiana